"Llamas with Hats" is a black comedy animated video series produced by FilmCow, an independent company created by Jason Steele after the success of his viral short film Charlie the Unicorn. The first episode was released in 2009, with twelve episodes total. The first video introduces Carl and Paul, two llamas that share an apartment, and focuses on Paul's reaction to Carl's murder of a human. It became progressively darker as time went on, with the final episode culminating in Carl's suicide some time after Paul has died.

Characters 
Carl, voiced by Chris Alex, is a grey llama who wears a green hat. In episode 4, he describes himself as "a dangerous sociopath with a long history of violence".

Paul, voiced by Jason Steele, is a beige llama who wears a red hat with a flower on it.  His name and gender are unknown until episode 3.

Plot 
The first video opens with Paul confronting Carl over the dead body he has discovered in their living room.  After questioning Carl, Paul discovers that Carl has eaten the dead man's hands in addition to murdering him. Carl's actions escalate with each episode.  In the second, Carl murders several people on a cruise ship before eventually causing its destruction with no survivors, as Carl disables all the other lifeboats.  The third has Carl destroy an unnamed South American country's government and gather the bodies of orphans for the purpose of constructing a "meat dragon". In the fourth, Carl destroys the city in which he and Paul live with a nuclear weapon and ties the citizen's faces to balloons, which rain down from the sky, allegedly as a surprise for Paul's birthday. The fifth opens with Carl detailing a seemingly-harmless day, only to reveal he has created a rift in the fabric of the universe from which he may harvest the severed hands from countless babies.  In the sixth, Paul makes the decision to move out and Carl has completed the dragon first mentioned in episode three. Subsequent episodes show Carl trying and failing to replace Paul, an attempt to reconcile, and Carl's further mental decay until he throws himself from a bridge in the finale upon discovering Paul's remains (and after Carl had destroyed all other life on Earth).

Production 
According to Steele, his vision for the series evolved after fans successfully predicted that Carl would blow up the earth in the fifth episode.

Steele recorded the audio for the series using Amadeus Pro and edited it all together in Final Cut Pro. Adobe Flash was used to draw individual characters, while Adobe Photoshop was used to draw the backgrounds for the series.  The program Magpie Pro 2 was used for lip syncing, and the series itself was animated in Adobe After Effects.

Reception 
The American television series The Good Wife made reference to the series in the episode "Killer Song," which aired on March 29, 2011. The series has received over 120 million views on YouTube.

Storybook

A storybook called, "Llamas with Hats: Babies"  was released in August 2019, nearly 4 years after the finale was released on YouTube.

Games

Two games were created by Steele following the success of the series, the Llamas with Hats: Hungry for Hands Card Game in 2017 and Llamas with Hats: Cruise Catastrophe in 2013, a mobile game available in the iTunes store for Apple devices and the Google Play store for Android.  Steele released a set of text message stickers for Apple devices in 2017.

References 

YouTube original programming
Animated television series about mammals